Sailoz Mookherjea (1906–1960) was an Indian painter. He is one of the early modernists who showed a flair for simplification of forms, vigorous lines and dynamic movement. He is on the 1979 list of Nine Masters of Archaeological Survey of India. His work was deeply inspired by people and the environment. India Post released a stamp, The Mosque, with his painting on it.

Career
Sailoz Mookherjea's simplification of form and vibrancy were derived from his years in Europe and inspiration from works of Matisse, but his main influences were folk art and Basohli miniatures. He focused on themes such as oneness with nature and rural serenity. His line were bold and color technique powerful.

During his time in New Delhi in the 1940s and 50s, he meet frequently with other painters of the Bengal school of art, especially with Manishi Dey and Shantanu Ukil.

He was highly regarded by both artists like Jagdish Swaminathan and critics like Richard Bartholomew who had the following to say about him ...There should have been a monument dedicated to Sailoz in the middle of Connaught place instead of an ugly fountainThere is not a single work of Amrita Sher-Gil which can stand before his painting Washing DayThe reason he has not gotten the recognition – is that he lacks in pretentiousnessFor after Amrita Sher-Gil .. – He has been our most significant painter

References

Indian male painters
Bengali Hindus
Bengali male artists
1960 deaths
1906 births
Government College of Art & Craft alumni
University of Calcutta alumni
20th-century Indian painters
Painters from West Bengal
20th-century Indian male artists